is an actress and former member of the Japanese idol girl group AKB48 under Team A.

Biography 
Iwata was born on May 13, 1998 in Sendai, Miyagi Prefecture. Her mother is Miwa Sugawara, who works as a TV personality in Sendai. As a child, Iwata and her mother appeared in local information programs together, and musicals. She auditioned for AKB48, but the Tōhoku earthquake struck just before the final screening and she was affected by the disaster, so she considered withdrawing from the audition. However, the auditions were postponed, so Iwata continued to participate and was selected to join the group as a 12th kenkyusei (trainee) in April 2011.

In December 2011, Iwata auditioned for a role in the TV animated series AKB0048 and was selected to play the main character, Nagisa Motomiya. As part of the anime project, she sang with eight other AKB48 members in the subunit No Name on the show's theme songs. In March 2012, during the Saitama Super Arena concert, Iwata was one of the trainee members who were promoted to full AKB48 members in the new Team 4. She also participated on her first A-side, on the AKB48 single Manatsu no Sounds Good!. In July 2012, Iwata was selected to host a TV program on NHK as part of a series to support the areas affected by the 2011 Tōhoku earthquake and tsunami, which included Sendai. She mentioned that she had lived in a shelter for a while before auditioning for AKB48. On August 24, 2012, AKB48 had a major restructuring, in which Team 4 was dissolved, and Iwata was moved to Team A.
On January 5, 2016, Iwata announced she would be leaving the group. AKB48 held her graduation events for Iwata in March 2016.

Just before graduating from AKB48, she moved to the Japanese major talent agency Horipro. She has appeared in numerous stage productions, musicals, films and TV dramas, as well as appearing in concerts organised by Horipro, performing songs and dances from her AKB48 days. In June 2021, she appeared in a concert to celebrate the 10th anniversary of the 12th generation of AKB48, her first appearance in five years at an AKB48 theatre. She is currently playing the role of Delphi Diggory in Harry Potter and the Cursed Child in Tokyo from June 2022.

Discography

Singles

With AKB48

A sides
 "Manatsu no Sounds Good!"

B sides 
 "Kaze wa Fuiteiru"
 "Tsubomitachi" – Team 4+Kenkyūsei
 "Give Me Five!"
 "New Ship" – Special Girls A
 "Gingham Check"
 "Ano Hi no Fūrin" – Waiting Girls
 "Uza"
 "Tsugi no Season" – Under Girls
 "Kodoku na Hoshizora" – Team A
 "So Long!"
 "Ruby" – Team A
 "Sayonara Crawl"
 "Bara no Kajitsu" – Under Girls
 "Ikiru Koto" – Team A
 "Heart Electric"
 "Kaisoku to Doutai Shiryoku" – Under Girls
 "Kiss made Countdown" – Team A
 "Mae shika Mukanee"
 "Konjo" – Talking Chimpanzees
 "Labrador Retriever"
 "Kimi wa Kimagure" – Team A
 "Kokoro no Placard"
 "Sailor Zombie" – Milk Planet
 "Kibōteki Refrain"
 "Juujun na Slave" – Team A
 "Utaitai" – Katareagumi (Cattleya Group)
 "Kuchibiru ni Be My Baby"
 "Yasashii Place" – Team A
 "Kimi wa Melody"
 "M.T. ni Sasagu" – Team A

With Hana wa Saku Project

With No Name 
 "Kibō ni Tsuite" (August 1, 2012)
 "Kono Namida o Kimi ni Sasagu" (April 10, 2013)

With Wake Up, Girls! Project

Appearances

TV dramas 
 Majisuka Gakuen 2 (Final episode, July 1, 2011, TV Tokyo), as Rena
 Majisuka Gakuen 3 (Episode 8, September 7, 2012, TV Tokyo)
 Sailor Zombie (2014, TV Tokyo), as Milk Planet, Karen
 Majisuka Gakuen 4 (First episode, January 19, 2015, Nippon TV), as Masamune
 Majisuka Gakuen 5 (Episode Nine, October 6, 2015, Hulu), as Anison

Films
 Solomon's Perjury (2015), as Saori Kawara
 The Magnificent Nine (2016), as Kayo
 Saki Achiga-hen episode of Side-A (2018), as Seiko Matano
 The Last Passenger (2023), as Mizuki
 Eternal New Mornings (2023), as Shoko Miyamoto

Anime 
 AKB0048 (April 29, 2012 – July 22, 2012), as Nagisa Motomiya
 AKB0048 Next Stage (January 5, 2013 – March 30, 2013), as Nagisa Motomiya/Atsuko Maeda the 14th

TV variety shows 
  (2003 – 2010, Higashinippon Broadcasting)
  (July 1, 2011 – 2016, TBS)
  (March 16, 2012 – 2016, TV Tokyo)
 AKBingo! (July 18, 2012 – 2016, Nippon TV)
 Ashita e 1 min "Karen no Fukkō Calendar" (August 28, 2012 – March 7, 2016, NHK General TV) — host
 Zenryoku Ōen! NHK-hai Fugure 2012: Ginban Athlete-tachi (November 11–15, 2012, NHK General TV, NHK BS1) — host

Stages 
 Broadway Musical Footloose (September 15 – October 12, 2014), as Wendy Joe
 Danganronpa: Trigger Happy Havoc (June 16 – July 16, 2016), as Aoi Asahina
 Wake Up, Girls! Record of Green Leaves (Aoba no Kiroku) (January 19 – 22, 2017), as Megumi Yoshikawa
 Silent Möbius (March 29 – April 2, 2017), as Katsumi Liqueur
 CEDAR Produce vol.3 The Robbers (May 31 – June 3, 2018), as Amalia von Edelreich
 Kami no Kiba: Jinga (January 5, 2019), Guest appearance
 CEDAR Produce vol.5 Demons (January 23 – 29, 2020), as Lizaveta Nikolaevna Tushina (Liza) 
 Brighton Beach Memoirs (September 18 – October 13, 2021), as Laurie Morton
 Harry Potter and the Cursed Child (June 16, 2022 –), as Delphi Diggory

References

External links 
  at Horipro 
 

1998 births
Living people
AKB48 members
Japanese idols
Japanese women pop singers
Japanese voice actresses
Voice actresses from Sendai
Sony Music Entertainment Japan artists
Musicians from Miyagi Prefecture
21st-century Japanese women singers
21st-century Japanese singers
21st-century Japanese actresses
Horipro